Ariel Krasouski (born 26 May 1958) is a former Uruguayan international footballer and manager.

Titles
  Boca Juniors 1981 (National Argentine Primera División Championship)

External links
 
 

1958 births
Living people
People from San José Department
Uruguayan footballers
Uruguayan expatriate footballers
Uruguay under-20 international footballers
Uruguay international footballers
Montevideo Wanderers F.C. players
Liverpool F.C. (Montevideo) players
Club Atlético River Plate (Montevideo) players
Centro Atlético Fénix players
C.A. Rentistas players
San Lorenzo de Almagro footballers
Boca Juniors footballers
Estudiantes de La Plata footballers
Argentine Primera División players
Expatriate footballers in Argentina
Danubio F.C. managers
Association football midfielders